The Royal Scoundrel (沙灘仔與周師奶) is a 1991 Hong Kong comedy film directed by Johnnie To and Jonathan Chik.

Cast and roles
 Lam Chung
 Waise Lee - Lee Nam
 Tony Leung Chiu-Wai - Beach Boy
 Ng Man-tat - Chow
 Wong Tin-lam  
 Alan Chui Chung-San - Lo To Keung
 Wong Yat Fei - Rusty
 Jacklyn Wu - Yuk

External links
 IMDb entry
 Hong Kong Cinemagic entry

1991 films
1991 comedy films
Hong Kong comedy films
Police detective films
1990s Cantonese-language films
Films directed by Johnnie To
Films set in Hong Kong
Films shot in Hong Kong
1990s Hong Kong films